Gerard Batliner (9 December 1928 – 25 June 2008) was a political figure from Liechtenstein.

He was born in Eschen, Liechtenstein. He studied law at the University of Fribourg and was an attorney-at-law.

Prime Minister of Liechtenstein

Batliner was Head of Government (Regierungschef) of Liechtenstein (1962–1970).

Other roles

Batliner served as the President of the Landtag, Liechtenstein parliament, from January 1974 to December 1977, and was a member of the European Commission on Human Rights (1983–1990).

He received honorary degrees from the University of Basel and Innsbruck. He died in Eschen.

See also

 Politics of Liechtenstein

References

External links
Batliner Wanger Batliner: Gerard Batliner - attorney profile
 Comment on the Liechtenstein constitution
 Profil Detail DDr. h.c. Gerard Batliner

1928 births
2008 deaths
University of Fribourg alumni
Members of the Landtag of Liechtenstein
Speakers of the Landtag of Liechtenstein
Heads of government of Liechtenstein
Progressive Citizens' Party politicians
Liechtenstein lawyers
20th-century lawyers